Jae is a single-syllable Korean given name, as well as element in two-syllable Korean given names. Its meaning differs based on the hanja chosen by the name-giver.

Hanja and meaning
, regulations of the Supreme Court of Korea permit the following 20 hanja with the reading Jae, plus seven variant forms, to be registered for use in given names.

Eleven characters from the table of basic hanja for educational use:

: "talent"
 (variant)
: "timber"
: "wealth"
: "to exist", "to be located at"
 (variant)
: "to plant", "to cultivate"
 (variant)
: "twice", "again"
: emphasis particle in Classical Chinese grammar
: "disaster"
 (variant)
: "to cut"
: "to load"
: "to rule"

Nine characters from the table of additional hanja for name use:

: "Juglans mandshurica" (tree)
 (variant)
: "matter", "affair"
: "to fast"
Additional : "study room", "studio"
 (variant)
: old name of the Dadu River in Sichuan
Additional : "to be clear"
 (variant)
: "remnants", "dregs"
: "to bring"
: "to receive in one's palm"
: "wealth"
: "one's own child"

People
People with the single-syllable given name Jae include:
Gil Jae (1353–1419), Goryeo and early Joseon Dynasty neo-Confucian scholar
Hur Jae (born 1965), South Korean basketball coach and former player

Korean people who have shortened their full names to Jae in English include:
Jae U. Jung (Jung Jae-ung; born 1960), South Korean biologist
Jae Chong (Chong Jae-yun; born 1972), American music producer
Jae Seo (Seo Jae-woong; born 1977), South Korean baseball player
Jae Yoo (Yoo Hyuk-jae; born 1989), South Korean model
Jaejae (Lee Eun-jae; born 1990), South Korean television personality
Jae Park (Park Jae-hyung; born 1992), American singer of Korean descent

As a name element
Names which begin with this syllable include:

Jae-hee
Jae-beom
Jae-eun
Jae-gyu
Jae-hee
Jae-ho
Jae-hyuk
Jae-hyun
Jae-in
Jae-joon
Jae-kyung
Jae-shin
Jae-suk
Jae-seop
Jae-sung
Jae-won
Jae-woo
Jae-wook
Jae-woong
Jae-yong
Jae-yoon
Jae-young

Names which end with this syllable include:

Eun-jae
Han-jae
Hyuk-jae
Min-jae
Seung-jae
Sung-jae
Won-jae

Notes

References

Korean given names